The Barrow-in-Furness Tramways Company operated a tramway service in Barrow-in-Furness between 1885 and 1932.

History

The Barrow-in-Furness Tramways Company was owned by Barrow-in-Furness Corporation. It started steam operated tramway services on 11 July 1885, with eight steam locomotives from Kitson and Company  and eight trailers from the Falcon Works.

On 23 December 1899 it was taken over by British Electric Traction who proceeded to modernise and electrify the system. The first electric service ran on 6 February 1904.

Barrow-in-Furness Corporation took over operation of the service on 1 January 1920 at a cost of £96,250 (equivalent to £ in ). The last service ran on 5 April 1932.

Network map

References

Tram transport in England
Transport in Barrow-in-Furness
4 ft gauge railways in England